Begunbari is a slum mahallah (neighborhood) in Ward 37 of Tejgaon Thana, Dhaka, Bangladesh. According to the 2011 Bangladesh census, it had 9,034 households and a population of 34,517.

See also
 Hatirjheel

References

Further reading
 
 

Neighbourhoods in Dhaka